Hinrik Bornemann (b. circa 1450 in Hamburg, d. 1499- Also known as Henrik Bornemann or Hinrich Bornemann) was a Northern German Late Gothic painter. He was the son of Hans Bornemann, who died in 1474. After his father's death his mother was thrice remarried to painters- to Hinrik Funhof (d. 1485), to Absolon Stumme (d. 1499), and then finally to Wilm Dedeke (d. 1528). His main work was the Altarpiece of St. Luke (Lukas-Altar) for St. Mary's Cathedral in Hamburg, now shown in St. James the Greater Church. Upon his death in 1499 it was left unfinished, and was completed by Wilm Dedeke.

See also
 List of German painters

References 
 Goldgrund und Himmelslicht. Mittelalter in Hamburg. Exhibit Catalog from the Hamburger Kunsthalle, Hamburg 1999.
 Gmelin, Hans Georg. "Bornemann." In Grove Art Online. Oxford Art Online,  (accessed 3 February 2012; subscription required).
 Hinrik Bornemann. In: Allgemeines Künstlerlexikon (AKL). Die Bildenden Künstler aller Zeiten und Völker. Vol. 13, Saur, München 1996, p. 79
 Hinrik Bornemann. In: Ulrich Thieme, Felix Becker u. a.: Allgemeines Lexikon der Bildenden Künstler von der Antike bis zur Gegenwart. Vol. 4, Wilhelm Engelmann, Leipzig 1910, p. 367

External links 
 
 Entry for Hinrich Bornemann on the Union List of Artist Names

Gothic painters
Painters from Hamburg
15th-century German painters
German male painters
1450s births
1499 deaths